The Memphis Reds were a Minor League Baseball team that played in the League Alliance in 1877. They were located in Memphis, Tennessee, and played their home games at Central Park. The Reds accumulated a record of 7–8 (.467) in their only season of competition.

In 1885, the city was represented in the Southern League by a different team also called the Memphis Reds.

Notable players
Six Reds also played in at least one game in Major League Baseball during their careers. They were:

Doc Kennedy
Tom Loftus
Harry Luff
John Maloney
Billy Redmond
John Shoupe
Oscar Walker

References

External links
Statistics from Baseball-Reference
Statistics from Stats Crew

1877 establishments in Tennessee
1877 disestablishments in Tennessee
Baseball teams established in 1877
Baseball teams disestablished in 1877
Defunct baseball teams in Tennessee
League Alliance teams
Professional baseball teams in Tennessee
Sports teams in Memphis, Tennessee